Metacrangon munita, commonly known as the coastal spinyhead, is a species of caridean shrimp native to the northeastern Pacific Ocean.

Description
The rostrum is short and rounded, and the carapace bears two median spines, one submedian spine on each side and a forward-pointing, hepatic spine just below and in front of the submedian spine. The anterior median spine is much shorter than the posterior one and does not extend as far as the eye sockets. There are five pairs of legs and the dactyl of the fifth leg is not wide and flattened. The pale brown and whitish disruptive coloration as well as the spines and bristles on the carapace make it difficult to discern the features of this shrimp.

Distribution and habitat
It is found on sandy substrates.

Ecology
This shrimp is nocturnal. A parasitic isopod sometimes attaches to its gills.

References

Caridea
Crustaceans described in 1852